Ross Treleaven (1907 – 4 March 1994) was an Australian rules footballer who played with Sturt in the South Australian National Football League (SANFL).

References

External links 		
Ross Treleaven's profile at AustralianFootball.com

		
		
		

1907 births
1994 deaths
Sturt Football Club players
Australian rules footballers from South Australia